The 1950 Massachusetts gubernatorial election was held on November 7, 1950. Democratic incumbent Paul A. Dever defeated Republican Arthur W. Coolidge, Socialist Labor candidate Horace Hillis, and Prohibition candidate Mark R. Shaw.

Democratic primary
Paul Dever ran unopposed for the Democratic gubernatorial nomination.

Republican primary

Candidates
Clarence A. Barnes, former Massachusetts Attorney General
Arthur W. Coolidge, former Lieutenant Governor
Louis E. Denfeld, U.S. Navy Admiral
Frankland W. L. Miles, Justice of the Roxbury District Court
Daniel Needham, former Commander of the Massachusetts National Guard and Public Safety Commissioner
Edward Rowe, former State Senator from Cambridge

Results

General election

Results

See also
 1949–1950 Massachusetts legislature

References

1950
Massachusetts governor
Governor
November 1950 events in the United States